Nina Reis (born 16 February 1980) is a retired Swedish professional golfer who played on the Ladies European Tour (LET) and LPGA Tour. She was runner-up at the 2008 Göteborg Masters after an LET joint record 11-under-par round of 61 and finished top-10 at the 2006 Women's British Open.

Amateur career
Reis was part of the Swedish team, together with Kristina Engström, Anna Gertsson, Mikaela Parmlid, Helena Svensson and Linda Wessberg, which won the 2001 European Ladies' Team Championship at Golf de Mais, Spain.

She played collegiate golf at the University of North Texas. She was a two-time all-conference selection while at North Texas in 2000 and 2001. In 2001 she led the team in stroke average and was named to the All-Sun Belt Conference team. In 2000 she was named to the first-team All-Big West squad. Reis had six top-10 finishes her freshman season and finished tied for fifth at the Big West Conference Championship.

Professional career
Reis turned professional in 2003 and joined the LET. She then joined the LPGA Tour in 2006 after a successful LPGA Final Qualifying Tournament where she finished 16th. She recorded top-10 finishes at the 2006 State Farm Rail Classic and 2008 Corona Championship, as well as the 2006 Women's British Open.

Her best LET season was 2008 when she played in 16 events and posted four top-10 finishes, including runner-up finishes at the Göteborg Masters and Open de France Dames, back to back in September. She was also fourth at SAS Ladies Masters and ninth at Nykredit Masters. She finished 22nd on the LET Money List.

Round of 61
Reis scored 270 (−18) by shooting 69-67-73-61 at the 2008 Göteborg Masters. The 11-under-par 61 tied the LET 18-hole record for all time lowest round set by Kirsty Taylor at the 2005 Wales Ladies Championship of Europe. After 17 holes, Reis was at −12 for the day and a score of 59 looked possible, but she bogeyed the last hole to drop back to −11 for the day and a total −18 for second place, her career best finish on the LET. Gwladys Nocera won after scoring 259 (−29) following rounds of 66-62-65-66, the best 72-hole score in the LET's 30-year history.

Source:

Professional wins (6)

Swedish Golf Tour (6)

Team appearances
Amateur
European Lady Junior's Team Championship (representing Sweden): 2000
European Ladies' Team Championship (representing Sweden): 2001 (winners)

See also
Ladies European Tour records

References

External links

Swedish female golfers
North Texas Mean Green women's golfers
Ladies European Tour golfers
LPGA Tour golfers
People from Kungälv Municipality
Sportspeople from Gothenburg
1980 births
Living people